A wig was a type of bun or small cake in English cuisine. Leavened with ale or barm, they were flavored with caraway and not as sweet as modern buns.

History

The Oxford English Dictionary records uses of the term as early as 1376 in records of the London Guildhall . Another record dating to 1413 is known from the court rolls of Maldon, Essex: ...panis wastel pistoris de Writle in defectus xs; item, le wigg ejusdem in defectu, xs. It was defined in the Promptorium Parvulorum as "brede (P. or bunne brede)".

Thomas More's 1529 Dialogue Concerning Heresies includes a reference to those who become drunk during Lent on wigs (meaning "wine-dipped buns") and cracknels (meaning biscuits): "".

In Richard Surflet's translation of Charles Estienne's Maison Rustique into English it says "The workers in pastrie do use the rising of beere to make their wigs withall". Jack a Lent (1620) by John Taylor described "round halfe-penny loaues ... transformed into square wiggs, (which wigges like drunkards are drowned in their Ale)." Samuel Pepys wrote in his diary "the only Lenten supper I have had of wiggs and ale."

Customs

A simplified form of the wigg bun was distributed in Herefordshire by a farmer to his workers, with butter and eggs omitted, for dipping in a bowl of ale with cheese as a supper during the harvest. They were also served at funerals dunked in arval ale, or eaten with arval cheese.

References

Buns
English cuisine